Haut-Katanga District (Upper Katanga District) is a former district located in the former Katanga Province of the Democratic Republic of the Congo. 
The copper mining centers of Lubumbashi and Likasi were surrounded by the district but were administratively separate.

Historical province
From 1963 to 1966, the area was constituted as Katanga Oriental. In 1966, it was merged with the former Lualaba Province to create Sud-Katanga, and was then merged into the new Shaba Region. Presidents of Katanga Oriental were:

 13 Aug 1963 - 20 Jul 1965  Édouard Bulundwe                   (b. 1932)
 20 Jul 1965 - 24 Apr 1966  Godefroid Munongo                  (s.a.)

Approximate correspondence between historical and current province

Successor provinces

Haut-Katanga district was part of a proposed Haut-Katanga province to be established when the country's new constitution was implemented, originally slated for February 2009.
The new province was to include the current district and also the cities of Lubumbashi and Likasi, with Lubumbashi as its capital.

The re-partition was completed in 2015, forming Haut-Katanga Province.

Territories
 Kambove
 Kasenga
 Kipushi
 Mitwaba
 Pweto
 Sakania

References

Haut-Katanga Province
Districts of Katanga Province
Districts of the Belgian Congo